Lieke van Wijk (born 18 September 1993) is a Dutch field hockey player.

Career

Club hockey
In the Dutch Hoofdklasse, van Wijk played club hockey until 2019 for Laren. With Laren she won the Hoofdklasse Indoor Hockey in 2018. From the 2019 season she played 3 years for Hurley and from 2022 on she is playing for Pinoké. In the 2022-2023 season, van Wijk became again Hoofdklasse Indoor Hockey champion of the Netherlands together with Pinoké.

National teams

Under–21
Playing for Netherlands junior teams for 4 years, van Wijk won 4 gold medals; two EuroHockey Junior Nations Championships, one Youth Olympic Games and one Junior World Cup.

Indoor
Lieke van Wijk also plays at an international level for the Netherlands Indoor hockey team. With the team, she won gold at the 2016 EuroHockey Indoor Championship, silver at the 2018 EuroHockey Indoor Championship, silver at the 2020 EuroHockey Indoor Championship and again silver at the 2022 EuroHockey Indoor Championship.

At the 2018 Indoor Hockey World Cup van Wijk won silver. Van Wijk won gold at the 2023 Women's FIH Indoor Hockey World Cup.

References

1993 births
Living people
Dutch female field hockey players
Field hockey players at the 2010 Summer Youth Olympics
Youth Olympic gold medalists for the Netherlands

2018 FIH Indoor Hockey World Cup players
2023 FIH Indoor Hockey World Cup players